The North Loop, also commonly called The Warehouse District, is a neighborhood of the Central community of Minneapolis, Minnesota that was Minneapolis's main commercial district during the city's years as a midwestern shipping hub. Although only a little commercial shipping is still done in the neighborhood, the historic warehouses still dominate the neighborhood. Some of these buildings have been repurposed into restaurants, shops, and apartments.

Because of this identity, the neighborhood is commonly known as the Warehouse District.  It includes the Minneapolis Warehouse Historic District which is listed on the National Register of Historic Places.  The North Loop is located northwest of the central business district between downtown Minneapolis and the Mississippi River. Streets in the North Loop are oriented to be parallel to the river, which means that they run at a 45-degree angle relative to the grid of the rest of the city.

Although the neighborhood technically extends further to the south, the main residential and commercial area of the North Loop is roughly a rectangle bounded by the railroad tracks as Cedar Lake Trail (in the southeast), Plymouth Avenue (in the northwest), the elevated 4th street freeway entrance/exit in the southwest, and the Mississippi River in the northeast.  Washington Avenue is the main thoroughfare through the neighborhood.

The James I. Rice Park, which is in the northeast portion of the neighborhood along the river, is popular with residents during the summer months. The bike trail and West River Parkway that runs through the park are part of the Grand Rounds Scenic Byway.  The park added a playground in 2010 located where 4th Ave North intersects with West River Parkway.

History

For most of its history, the North Loop was an industrial area. It was home to a large railroad yard and numerous warehouses and factories. Much of the warehouse district (very roughly bounded by Second Street North, First Avenue North, Sixth Street North, and the BNSF Railway tracks, except for the Interstate 394 and Interstate 94 ramps) is listed on the National Register of Historic Places.

The warehouses that characterize the district are mostly six to eight stories high, and about 62 structures on seven square blocks contribute to the district. The predominant form of design is the Chicago Commercial style, but many other styles were built, including Italianate, Queen Anne style, Richardsonian Romanesque, Classical Revival, and early 20th century commercial styles. The warehouse district was in turn associated with the railroad transportation network that was under development at the time, which connected Minneapolis with the rest of the Midwest and the rest of the country. These warehouses were used for wholesale and storage of goods related to milling and manufacturing. The nomination for the National Register of Historic Places states that the district, as a whole, comprises a cohesive district of buildings with a common physical appearance, as well as a common age and original use.

In the 1980s, the Warehouse district was the epicenter of the Minneapolis art scene until the area's buildings became more commercially desirable in the 1990s. At its peak, the Wyman Building, 400 First Avenue North, was home to more than twenty contemporary art galleries. No Name Gallery was formerly located in the eastern part of the neighborhood, before it moved out of the district and became the Soap Factory .

Today

While some industrial tenants remain (particularly in the area southwest of 4th Street), many of the old factories and warehouses have been converted to commercial space or loft condominiums and apartments. The area still retains some feel of its industrial past, as many newer buildings have attempted to replicate the style of the old warehouses.

Since the mid-1990s, when the gentrification of the neighborhood accelerated, thousands of people have moved into the North Loop. The neighborhood is particularly popular with people who work in downtown Minneapolis, whose proximity allows residents to walk, bike, or take a short bus or METRO ride to work. Coffee shops, restaurants, bars, art galleries, and small retail stores have also moved into the neighborhood in recent years.

The Tony Award-winning Theatre de la Jeune Lune (Closed and building sold) and the Traffic Zone Center for Visual Art, a prominent artist cooperative and gallery space, are located in the eastern part of the neighborhood. The largest employer is the Federal Reserve Bank of Minneapolis, which is located at the southwest end of the Hennepin Avenue Bridge.

In 2005, the North Loop Neighborhood Association launched a re-branding project lead by committee members Lisa Goldson Armstrong and Marybeth George. With the design talents from agency Little & Co, they launched a new logo and style guide for the North Loop which supported the neighborhood transformation. (https://www.journalmpls.com/news/2005/05/hip-hooray-new-logo-for-north-loop/)

In September 2006, the North Loop Neighborhood Association received funding to build a dog park for North Loop residents. A temporary dog park has been built on 3rd St and 7th Ave.

Target Field, home of the Minnesota Twins, opened in 2010, is on the southwest edge of the neighborhood. Plans call for the construction of condominiums and apartments for several thousand new residents near the stadium. The area is also served by Target Field (Metro Transit Station), the new terminus for the Northstar Commuter Rail, Metro Transit Blue, Green and future light rail lines.

Notable residents
 Dane Rauschenberg, author; long-distance runner

See also
Interstate 335
Neighborhoods of Minneapolis

References

External links

 Stein LLC Neighborhood Retail Design Firm
 North Loop Neighborhood Association
 Warehouse District Business Association (WDBA)
 Theatre de la Jeune Lune
 Traffic Zone Center for Visual Art
 Minneapolis Heritage Preservation Commission map of the Warehouse District

Neighborhoods in Minneapolis
Warehouse districts of the United States
National Register of Historic Places in Minneapolis
Economy of Minneapolis
Warehouses on the National Register of Historic Places
Entertainment districts in the United States
Historic districts on the National Register of Historic Places in Minnesota
Romanesque Revival architecture in Minnesota
Neoclassical architecture in Minnesota
Minnesota populated places on the Mississippi River